Snarls is an American indie rock band from Columbus, Ohio.
The group consists of Chlo White, bassist Riley Hall, guitarist Mick Martinez, and drummer Max Martinez.

History
Singer Chlo White was born in Indiana, but moved to the Columbus area when they were 7 years old. The rest of the band originated in the Columbus metropolitan area. The band formed through childhood friendships and attending The Arts & College Preparatory Academy. Martinez met bassist Riley Hall the first day of high school. White met Martinez after the recommendation from a teacher. Martinez and Hall were the only two to have known each other prior, having been friends their whole lives. After forming, the band began working on music together and released their debut self-titled EP in 2018. The band released a new song in January 2020 called Marbles. alongside the announce of their debut album, Burst. In 2021, Snarls released a new EP titled What About Flowers?, which was produced by ex-Death Cab For Cutie member Chris Walla.

Discography
Studio albums
Burst (2020, Take This To Heart)
EPs
Snarls (2018, self-released)
What About Flowers? (2021, Take This To Heart)

References

Indie rock musical groups from Ohio
Musical groups from Columbus, Ohio
Year of establishment missing
Take This To Heart Records artists